The fourth season of The Contender was recorded in Singapore (with the exception of the live finale), and premiered on Versus on December 3, 2008. The show was on its third network, with the first season being broadcast on NBC and second and third seasons being shown on ESPN.

Contestants
The following 16 fighters, hailing from around the globe, were selected to take part in the fourth Contender Tournament which took place in the cruiserweight division.

Records entering tournament in parentheses (W-L-D)

Trainers
Tommy Brooks
John Bray

Emcee for the series

 Perry Cale -Australia

Fight results
Episode 1 
Felix Cora Jr. defeats Joell Godfrey by unanimous decision.
50-45 | 50-45 | 49-46
Blue Team 1, Gold Team 0

Episode 2
Alfredo Escalera Jr. defeats Jon Schneider by unanimous decision.
49-45 | 50-44 | 49-45
Blue Team 2, Gold Team 0

Episode 3
Akinyemi "A.K." Laleye defeats Erick Vega by unanimous decision.
50-46 | 49-46 | 49-46
Blue Team 2, Gold Team 1

Episode 4
Deon Elam defeats Richard Gingras by unanimous decision.
50-45 | 49-46 | 48-47
Blue Team 2, Gold Team 2

Episode 5
Ehinomen "Hino" Ehikhamenor defeats Darnell Wilson by unanimous decision.
50-44 | 50-45 | 50-44
Gold Team 3, Blue Team 2

Episode 6
Troy Ross defeats Lawrence Tauasa by TKO (referee stoppage) in round two.
Gold Team 4, Blue Team 2

Episode 7
Rico Hoye defeats Mike Alexander by unanimous decision.
49-46 | 48-47 | 49-46
Gold Team 5, Blue Team 2
Ryan Coyne defeats Tim Flamos by split decision.
49-46 | 47-48 | 48-47
Gold Team 5, Blue Team 3

Episode 8
Quarterfinal 1
Troy Ross defeats Felix Cora Jr. by TKO (referee stoppage) in round one.
Time: 2:38

Episode 9
Quarterfinal 2
Akinyemi "A.K." Laleye defeats Alfredo Escalera Jr. by KO in round five.
Time: 1:51

Episode 10
Quarterfinal 3
 Ehinomen "Hino" Ehikhamenor defeats Deon Elam by unanimous decision.
49-46 | 49-46 | 49-46
Quarterfinal 4
Rico Hoye defeats Joell Godfrey by unanimous decision.
50-44 | 49-45 | 48-46
Hoye was originally scheduled to fight Ryan Coyne, but due to the severity of Coyne's cut that he sustained in his fight with Tim Flamos, he was unable to continue in the Contender Season 4 tournament. He was replaced by Joell Godfrey, who was invited back to the tournament to fight Rico.
Episode 11
Semifinal 1
Troy Ross defeats Akinyemi "A.K." Laleye by unanimous decision.
50-45 | 50-45 | 50-45
In preparation for the fight, as per the Gold Team's ritual, A.K. spells out "gorilla warfare" on the whiteboard in his locker room. In actuality, the term is "guerilla warfare".
Semifinal 2
Ehinomen "Hino" Ehikhamenor defeats Rico Hoye by unanimous decision.
50-45 | 48-47 | 49-46

Live finale at the MGM Foxwoods Casino in Connecticut 
February 25, 2009
Contender championship bout
Troy Ross defeats Ehinomen "Hino" Ehikhamenor by TKO in round four.
Third place bout
Rico Hoye defeats Akinyemi "A.K." Laleye by unanimous decision.
79-72 | 79-72 | 79-72
Other undercard bouts
Felix Cora Jr. defeats Tim Flamos by TKO in round three.
Ryan Coyne defeats Richard Gingras by unanimous decision.
Alfredo Escalera Jr. defeats Erick Vega by TKO in round six.

References

External links
Official website

2007 American television seasons
4